Odonthalitus conservanus is a species of moth of the family Tortricidae. It is found in Jalisco, Mexico.

The length of the forewings is 5 mm for males and 6.5-6.8 mm for females. The forewings are whitish with brown reticulations (a net-like pattern). The hindwings are light grey brown with darker grey-brown mottling.

Etymology
The species name refers to the conserved status of the type locality of Las Joyas in the Sierra de Manantlan in Mexico.

References

Moths described in 2000
Euliini